Astley Bridge railway station served the village of Astley, Greater Manchester, England, from 1877 to 1879 on the Astley Branch Railway.

History 
The station was opened on 15 October 1877 by the Lancashire and Yorkshire Railway. It was a short-lived station, closing on 1 October 1879.

References

Sources 

Disused railway stations in Greater Manchester
Former Lancashire and Yorkshire Railway stations
Railway stations in Great Britain opened in 1877
Railway stations in Great Britain closed in 1879
1877 establishments in England
1879 disestablishments in England